Mauloutchia is a genus of trees endemic to the lowland eastern and northern rain forests of Madagascar. They can be distinguished by their non-monocyclic androecium with anthers basifixed and borne on short filaments.

Species
According to the most recent revision of the genus there are ten accepted species:

 Mauloutchia annickiae Sauquet
 Mauloutchia capuronii Sauquet
 Mauloutchia chapelieri (Baill.) Warb.
 Mauloutchia coriacea Capuron
 Mauloutchia echinocarpa Capuron ex Sauquet
 Mauloutchia heckelii Capuron
 Mauloutchia humboltii (H. Perrier) Capuron
 Mauloutchia parvifolia Capuron
 Mauloutchia rarabe (H. Perrier) Capuron
 Mauloutchia sambiranensis (Capuron) Sauquet

References

Myristicaceae
Endemic flora of Madagascar
Magnoliales genera
Flora of the Madagascar lowland forests